Monte Hermoso Partido is a partido on the Atlantic coast of Buenos Aires Province in Argentina.

Its capital city is Monte Hermoso,  from Buenos Aires.

Geography 
Monte Hermoso is a resort (beach) town on the Southern Atlantic coast.

Climate
Monte Hermoso is situated in the eastern limit of a convergence zone between northern tropical air and southern (polar) cold fronts. It is generally breezy with a strong oceanic influence.

Distances
 Bahía Blanca, 
 San Carlos de Bariloche, 
 Buenos Aires, 
 Córdoba, 
 Mendoza, 
 Rosario,

Settlements
Monte Hermoso (pop. 5,394)
Balneario Sauce Grande (pop. 177)

References

External links

 
 Monte Hermoso
 Monte Hermoso News
 federal website
 National Meteorological Service

1978 establishments in Argentina
Partidos of Buenos Aires Province